
Year 342 BC was a year of the pre-Julian Roman calendar. At the time it was known as the Year of the Consulship of Ahala and Rutilus (or, less frequently, year 412 Ab urbe condita). The denomination 342 BC for this year has been used since the early medieval period, when the Anno Domini calendar era became the prevalent method in Europe for naming years.

Events 
 By place 

 Macedonia 
 The Greek philosopher, Aristotle, is invited by Philip II to his capital at Pella to tutor his son, Alexander. As the leading intellectual figure in Greece, Aristotle is commissioned to prepare Alexander for his future role as a military leader.
 Philip begins a series of campaigns in Thrace with the aim of annexing it to be a province of Macedonia. When the Macedonian army approaches Thracian Chersonese (the Gallipoli Peninsula), an Athenian general named Diopeithes ravages this district of Thrace, thus inciting Philip's rage for operating too near one of his towns in the Chersonese. Philip demands his recall. In response, the Athenian Assembly is convened. Demosthenes convinces the Athenians not to recall Diopeithes.

 Sicily 
 The Corinthian general Timoleon spreads his rule over Sicily, removing a number of other tyrants and preparing Sicily for another threatened Carthaginian invasion.

 Roman Republic 
 The Battle of Mount Gaurus is fought between the Romans and the Samnites. The battle is a success for the Romans, who, it is said, are led by Marcus Valerius Corvus. Fought at the foot of Mount Gaurus, near Cumae, it is the most notable engagement of the First Samnite War.

 China 
 In the course of the Warring States period, the army of the state of Qi defeats the army of the state of Wei in the Battle of Maling. This battle involves the military strategy of the general Sun Bin (descendant of Sun Tzu), and is the first battle in recorded history to give a reliable account of the handheld crossbow with trigger mechanism.

Births 
 Menander, Greek playwright (d. 291 BC)

Deaths 
 Pang Juan, Chinese general
 Antiphon, Greek arsonist, execution

References